Monsters and Critics is an online entertainment news website focusing on TV, movies and celebrities. It publishes news, reviews, recaps, interviews, feature articles, explainers, blogs and commentary. The website has been owned by Digital Minefield Ltd since November 2017 and has writers based in the US, Canada and the UK. In January 2022, the website migrated its anime news section to its subsidiary Anime Geek.

Background 

Monsters and Critics was founded in 2003 by James Wray and Ulf Stabe. Wray previously ran an online forum dedicated to The Lord of the Rings, and the website's name is a reference to J. R. R. Tolkien's 1936 lecture "Beowulf: The Monsters and the Critics". 

Monsters and Critics initially carried the slogan "Watch it ... Read It ... Play it", a reference to its early focus on covering entertainment franchises which spanned various media.

The site later moved into more mainstream entertainment news, and for several years also carried general news. Julian Cheatle, who previously worked at The Sun, joined as editor in 2015, before the site returned to its original focus on entertainment news. Monsters and Critics has three main sections dedicated to TV, movies and celebrity.

Monsters and Critics has been quoted in numerous newspapers and outlets including The New York Times, Los Angeles Times, and BBC News.

References

External links 
 

Internet properties established in 2003
News blogs